The American Bulldog is a large, muscular breed of mastiff-type that was used as stock dogs, catch dogs, and guardians on farms and ranches. The breed is descended from the Old English Bulldog, which is thought to have arrived in America as early as the 17th century, brought over by working-class immigrants from England. During WWI and WWII, the breed was on the verge of extinction, with the only surviving dogs being kept primarily on farms in the southeast. John D. Johnson and Alan Scott are widely regarded as the forefathers of rescuing the breed from extinction.
 On January 1, 1999, the United Kennel Club first recognized the American Bulldog. In November 2019, the American Bulldog was added to the American Kennel Club (AKC) Foundation Stock Service (FSS).

History 

The Old English Bulldog was preserved by working-class immigrants who brought their working dogs with them to the American South; these dogs are believed to have first appeared as early as the 17th century. Small farmer and ranch owners used this all-around working dog for many tasks including farm guardians, stock dogs, and catch dogs. These dogs were not a bona fide breed by modern standards as was the case for most other dogs; kennel clubs and breed registries did not exist until 1875, at least two centuries after the Old English Bulldog first migrated to America.  In the 17th and 18th centuries, the Old English Bulldog had many different strains for cattle-droving, bull-baiting, farm dogs, and butcher's dogs. Bull-baiting was also a common blood sport of the era and though  evidence exists of such migrating to America with the landrace bulldogs brought by working-class Englishmen in colonial times, the strains that migrated to America certainly were unaffected by the banning of the sport in 1835 in the U.K., so no need was seen for a decline in the population of the old-type bulldog.

In America, no records remain, but rather landrace strains are acknowledged that initially depended on where a dog's master originated in England, the majority of which were bred to work as evidenced by accounts of the age in local newspapers and written inventories upon death. Later, breeding decisions were dependent on the best working farm dogs, despite breed or background. Later, in states such as Texas, several separate strains of the "bulldog"-type dogs were kept by ranchers as utilitarian working dogs. Other dogs in time became guard dogs on plantations.

Perhaps the most important role of the American Bulldog and the reason for its survival, and in fact why it thrived throughout the South, was because of the presence of feral pigs, introduced to the New World and without predators. The bulldogs were the settlers' only means of sufficiently dealing with the vermin.

By World War II, the breed was near extinction until John D. Johnson scoured the backroads of the South looking for the best specimens to revive the breed. During this time, a young Alan Scott grew an interest in Johnson's dogs and began to work with him on the revitalization process. At some point, Scott began infusing non-Johnson catch bulldogs from working Southern farms with Johnson's lines, creating what is now known as the Standard type American Bulldog, also called the Scott type. At another point, Johnson began crossing his original lines with an atavistic English Bulldog from the North that had maintained its genetic athletic vigor, creating the Bully type American Bulldog, also known as the Johnson type or the Classic type.

American Bulldogs are now safe from extinction and their popularity has increased in their homeland, either as a working/protector dog, as a family pet, or both. All over the world, they are used variously as "hog dogs" (catching escaped hogs or hunting feral pigs), as cattle drovers, and as working or sport K-9s. American Bulldogs also successfully compete in several dog sports such as dog obedience, Schutzhund, French Ring, Mondioring, Iron Dog competition, and weight pulling. They are also exhibited in conformation shows in the UKC, ABA, ABRA, ORKC, EKC, and NKC.  The AKC added the American Bulldog to the FSS on November 11, 2019.

Appearance 

The American Bulldog is a stocky, well-built, strong-looking dog, with a large head and a muscular build. The shoulders and chest tend to be the most muscular parts of the American Bulldog. Its coat is short and generally smooth, requiring little maintenance except a bath every few weeks. The breed is a light to moderate shedder. Colors, while historically predominantly white with patches of red, black, or brindle, have grown in recent years to include many color patterns, including black, red, brown, fawn, and all shades of brindle. Black pigmentation on the nose and eye rims is traditionally preferred, with only some pink allowed. Eye color is usually brown, but heterochromia also occurs, although this is also considered a cosmetic fault. American Bulldogs are known to drool more than other breeds of dogs. The Bully type is generally a larger, heavier dog with a shorter muzzle, but the muzzle should never be so short that it causes difficulty with breathing. Standard types are generally more athletic with longer muzzles and a more square head. Many modern American Bulldogs are a combination of the two types, usually termed "hybrid". In general, American Bulldogs weigh between 27 and 54 kg (60 to 120 lb) and are 52 to 70 cm (20 to 28 in) at the withers, but have been known to greatly exceed these dimensions, especially in the "out of standard" nonworking stock.

Temperament and characteristics 

American Bulldogs are typically confident, social, ebullient, and lively dogs that are at ease with their families. They bond strongly with their owners, and are happiest when their masters can shower them with time and attention. They are not as friendly, however, with people they do not know; their ancestors were farm dogs that guarded the home, the livestock, and the children when their master was away. They mature later than many other breeds, not until the age of two, and as puppies they will be curious yet aloof with strangers, but confident at maturity.

Socialization of this breed is paramount; this breed should never be left alone, bored, in a house or garage day after day, as it may become chronically fearful and aggressive towards things it does not know or understand. This fear and aggression must be trained out of the dog immediately if the dog is obtained past the age of 18 months.

American Bulldogs are a known breed that will destroy furniture and shoes if they are not given enough to do, so this is yet another reason too much isolation is disastrous for this breed. Fear or aggression-causing triggers can include other dogs, children it does not know, postal workers, and strangers. An American Bulldog does not trust anyone at first sight and must learn from its master what is a threat and what is not, and a dog of this breed must learn when to be territorial and when everything is okay. 

With children, socialization from the time the dog is brought home is a must. True aggression towards babies and young children is rare and not characteristic of how the breed is meant to behave at all; this breed ordinarily likes children, and so long as it has had time to get to know them well, it is more likely to play with them than hurt them.  In fact, this breed can be very tolerant of a child's grabby hands that tug on its ears and can be a very devoted fellow mischiefmaker to the young ones in his family; the American Bulldog has a playful, impish streak when well-raised, well-bred, well-loved, and well-rounded. Owners of this breed ideally will understand that this is a high-octane, powerful, headstrong breed and they shall be very careful to set limitations and rules for their dog and reinforce obedience training throughout the dog's life. They will not be first-time owners of a dog and shall be firm, but fair – harsh and violent methods will not work in training this breed, as it will only backfire and make the dog shut down, stubbornly refusing to listen to any further commands and making it angrier and angrier. They will have access to places where the dog can exercise and run, but the owner will not take off the leash unless an area is enclosed with a high fence.

Unlike most other bulldog breeds, they are competent swimmers. That said, they do not have the affinity for water a retriever would: they swim if they have to do it, not because they particularly enjoy it. They are capable of jumping in excess of  vertically. A tall fence is a must to keep an American Bulldog from wandering off on an adventure and forgetting how to get home, so a microchip is highly recommended. Young American Bulldogs under the age of three years in particular love to bounce around and may accidentally knock over a toddler, a senior citizen, or a small child, so handling this breed on a leash is not recommended if one is a small child or an elderly adult, since the breed loves to pull and tug and may run away with those not strong enough to hold it.

They can do well with other dogs in the household or who visit regularly when properly introduced and supervised, preferably on neutral ground for the first few meetings so the American Bulldog in question can learn that this new dog has come to play, not to hurt his beloved family and home. They are not necessarily good with strange dogs, especially in chaotic environments like the dog park. The more exposure to good training practices and clear behavior expectations with other dogs and people, the more likely the success at being controlled both inside and outside of their environment and the natural physically strong and powerful nature of the breed can be channeled positively.

Ongoing training both in the home and outside of the home is essential for this breed. While the goal of the breed was originally to produce a working farm utility dog that could catch and hold wild boar and cattle, kill vermin, and guard an owner's property, when properly trained, exercised, and socialized, this breed can become a very loyal, clownish family pet who loves to play and join the family on outings.

It also doubles as a fine boarhound, and in its homeland it is often both a pet and a hunter at the same time: Southern Americans prize this breed as a courageous canine warrior in a Kevlar vest that will pin down an angry feral pig and defend the customary pack of hounds and the gunman from the pig's tusks. However, they also prize the breed having a soft, affectionate inner nature that can easily transition away from the hunt to a nice warm bath, a round of playing with the children, and have a well earned nap on its bed after getting a belly full of the barbecued wild hog ribs as a treasured member of the family. As a working breed, they are good on pigs as catch dogs and decent on cattle: they stand their ground when challenged by an angry steer and still retain the herding instinct. Overall, the American Bulldog is a breed that truly falls in love with his family and will do anything to keep it safe if the dog correctly senses danger up to, and including, risking its life to save them.

Health 

American Bulldogs generally live from 10 to 16 years, and tend to be strong, physically active, and often healthy. Some health problems in American bulldogs are often found within certain genetic lines, and are not common to the entire breed, while others, such as neuronal ceroid lipofuscinosis (NCL), Ichthyosis, disorders of the kidney and thyroid, ACL tears, hip dysplasia, cherry eye, elbow dysplasia, entropion, ectropion, and bone cancer are more common to the general population of American Bulldogs. There are DNA tests available to help breeders screen breeding animals for NCL (neuronal ceroid lipofuscinosis) and Ichthyosis. A Penn Hip (Pennsylvania Hip Improvement project) or OFA (Orthopedic Foundation for Animals) screening is recommended for all potential breeding animals. Some American Bulldogs are prone to allergies. Due to the ideal of beauty regarding the shape of the face the skull malformation brachycephaly was increased by breeding selection.

American Bulldogs in popular culture

Spike and Tyke from the Tom and Jerry franchise
Muggshot, a boss character from the Sly Cooper series and enforcer of the Fiendish Five
The Deftones' video Bloody Cape featured a model walking an American Bulldog down the street. The American Bulldog was actually played by two separate dogs from the Norcal's American Bulldog Kennel. The names of the dogs were Big Trouble and Tory Hesta.
In Return to Me (2000), David Duchovny's character's dog, Mel, is played by an American Bulldog named Peetey.
In the 2001 film Kevin of the North, one of Kevin Manley's sled dogs is an American Bulldog named Snowflake.
Nedd ("Nasty Evil Dead Dog") in The Number 23 (2007)
In Tucker & Dale vs. Evil (2010), Jangers, Tyler Labine's character's dog, is played by an American Bulldog named Weezer.
An American Bulldog features prominently as the titular character's companion in the 2013 film Joe.
The company logo for Zynga also featured an American Bulldog and was named after Mark Pincus' dog "Zinga".
Since the 1990s, American Bulldogs have become more frequently used in films as family pets, replacing the previously popular American Pit Bull Terriers and Bull Terriers. For example:
Chance from the feature film Homeward Bound: The Incredible Journey (1993) and its sequel, Homeward Bound II: Lost in San Francisco (1996). Suregrips Rattler (Chance) was only in the first Homeward Bound movie. The first film based on The Incredible Journey featured a Bull Terrier.
Although the original Petey from Hal Roach's Our Gang was an American Pit Bull Terrier, in the 1994 film remake The Little Rascals, Petey was played by an American Bulldog.
In Cheaper by the Dozen (2003) and Cheaper by the Dozen 2 (2005), an American Bulldog named Gunner is the family pet.

Gallery

See also
 Dogs portal
 List of dog breeds
 American Bulldog Association
 American Bully
 Bulldog type
 Catch dog
 Molossus
 Old English Bulldog
 Bulldog Type

References

External links 

 American Bulldog Association
 The Bulldog Information Lybrary: American Bulldog Types and Bloodlines

Bulldog breeds
Catch dogs
Dog breeds originating in the United States